Alasdair Lindsay Robert "Sandy" McNicol (15 June 1944 – 20 April 2017) was a New Zealand rugby union player. A prop, McNicol represented Wanganui at a provincial level, and was a member of the New Zealand national side, the All Blacks.

Playing career
McNicol represented Wanganui at a provincial level, and played for the All Blacks in 1973, as a replacement on the 1972–73 tour of Britain, Ireland, France and North America. He played five games for the All Blacks during the latter part of that tour, but did not appear in any test matches.

McNicol had a military background and later worked as a teacher. In 1973 he informed the New Zealand Rugby Union that he would be unavailable for selection to play against the touring South African side, owing to his objecting to apartheid. This resulted in his receiving death threats.

He later moved to France and played for Stadoceste Tarbais, who were French champions in 1973. He spent three years in Tarbes.

Later years
McNicol had dementia. He took his own life on 20 April 2017.

References

1944 births
Rugby union players from Lower Hutt
New Zealand rugby union players
New Zealand international rugby union players
Wanganui rugby union players
Rugby union props
New Zealand military personnel
People educated at Whangarei Boys' High School
Tarbes Pyrénées Rugby players
Suicides in Queensland
2017 suicides